The  San Diego Chargers season was the franchise's second season in the National Football League (NFL), and its 12th overall. The team improved on their 5–6–3 record in 1970. It was Harland Svare's first season as the team's head coach. After a 1-4 start, the Chargers would slightly improve, winning 3 of their next 4 games. However, they would lose 3 of their final 5 games en route to a 6-8 finish. The only bright spot was quarterback John Hadl who completed 233 passes out of 431 attempts for 3,075 yards and 21 touchdowns and won the NFL Man of the Year award as well as leading the league in both passing yards and touchdown passes.

Roster

Regular season

Schedule 

Note: Intra-division opponents are in bold text.

Standings

References 

San Diego Chargers
San Diego Chargers seasons
San Diego Chargers f